In Greek mythology, Hyperion ('he who goes before') was one of the twelve Titan children of Gaia (the Earth) and Uranus (the Sky). With his sister, the Titaness Theia, Hyperion fathered Helios (the Sun), Selene (the Moon) and Eos (the Dawn).

Hyperion was, along with his son Helios, a personification of the sun, with the two sometimes identified. John Keats's abandoned epic poem Hyperion is among the literary works that feature the figure.

Etymology 
"Hyperion" means "he that walks on high" or simply "the god above", often joined with "Helios". There is a possible attestation of his name in Linear B (Mycenaean Greek) in the lacunose form ]pe-rjo-[ (Linear B: ]-[), found on the KN E 842 tablet (reconstructed [u]-pe-rjo-[ne]) though it has been suggested that the name actually reads "Apollo" ([a]-pe-rjo-[ne]).

Mythology 
Hyperion is one of the twelve or thirteen Titans, the children of Gaia and Uranus. In the Theogony, Uranus imprisoned all the children that Gaia bore him, before he was overthrown. According to pseudo-Apollodorus, Uranus only imprisoned the Hecatoncheires and the Cyclopes but not the Titans, until Gaia persuaded her six Titan sons to overthrow their father Uranus and "they, all but Ocean, attacked him" as Cronus castrated him. Afterwards, in the words of Hesiod, Hyperion subjected his sister Theia to his love, and fathered on her three children, the lights of heaven; Helios (Sun), Selene (Moon) and Eos (Dawn). As is the case for most of the Titans, there are no myths or functions for Hyperion. He seems to exist only to provide a father for the three celestial deities. As a Titan, one of the oldest generation of gods, Hyperion was a fitting father for these three sky-gods who, as elements of the natural world, must have been conceived of as having come into being near the beginning of the cosmos.

Helios 
Hyperion and Helios were both sun-gods. In early sources sometimes the two were considered to be distinct, with Hyperion being the father of Helios, but sometimes they were apparently identified, with Hyperion being simply a title of, or another name for, Helios himself. Hyperion is Helios' father in Homer's Odyssey, Hesiod's Theogony, and the Homeric Hymn to Demeter. But in the Iliad and elsewhere in the Odyssey, Helios is also called "Helios Hyperion" with Hyperion here either being used as a patronymic or other epithet, while also in the Homeric epics, and in the Homeric Hymn to Apollo, besides being called Helios, he is sometimes also called simply Hyperion. In later sources the two sun-gods are distinctly father and son. In literature, the Sun is often referred to as "Hyperion's bright son."

Diodorus Siculus 
According to the rationalizing historian Diodorus Siculus, Hyperion was the name of the first person to understand the movement of the sun and moon, and their effect on the seasons, and explains that, because of this, he was said to be their "father":
Of Hyperion we are told that he was the first to understand, by diligent attention and observation, the movement of both the sun and the moon and the other stars, and the seasons as well, in that they are caused by these bodies, and to make these facts known to others; and that for this reason he was called the father of these bodies, since he had begotten, so to speak, the speculation about them and their nature.

Diodorus also recorded an unorthodox version of the myth, in which Hyperion married his sister Basileia and had two children by her, Helios and Selene; their brothers, envious of their happy issue and fearful that Hyperion would divert the royal power to himself, conspired and killed Hyperion along with his two children (which then went on to transform into the Sun and the Moon), leaving Basileia in great distress.

Legacy 
Hyperion, one of the moons of Saturn, is named after this god. Saturn itself is named after Hyperion's brother, Cronus. Roman equivalent, Saturnus.

Genealogy

See also 
 List of solar deities

Notes

References 

 Apollodorus, Apollodorus, The Library, with an English Translation by Sir James George Frazer, F.B.A., F.R.S. in 2 Volumes. Cambridge, Massachusetts, Harvard University Press; London, William Heinemann Ltd. 1921. . Online version at the Perseus Digital Library.
 Caldwell, Richard, Hesiod's Theogony, Focus Publishing/R. Pullins Company (June 1, 1987). .
 Campbell, David A., Greek Lyric, Volume III: Stesichorus, Ibycus, Simonides, and Others,  Loeb Classical Library No. 476, Cambridge, Massachusetts, Harvard University Press, 1991. . Online version at Harvard University Press.
 Diodorus Siculus, Library of History, Volume III: Books 4.59-8, translated by C. H. Oldfather, Loeb Classical Library No. 340. Cambridge, Massachusetts, Harvard University Press, 1939. . Online version at Harvard University Press. Online version by Bill Thayer.
 Euripides, The Phoenician Women, translated by E. P. Coleridge in The Complete Greek Drama, edited by Whitney J. Oates and Eugene O'Neill, Jr. Volume 2. New York. Random House. 1938. Online version at the Perseus Digital Library.
 Gantz, Timothy, Early Greek Myth: A Guide to Literary and Artistic Sources, Johns Hopkins University Press, 1996, Two volumes:  (Vol. 1),  (Vol. 2).
 Grimal, Pierre, The Dictionary of Classical Mythology, Wiley-Blackwell, 1996. .
 Hard, Robin, The Routledge Handbook of Greek Mythology: Based on H.J. Rose's "Handbook of Greek Mythology", Psychology Press, 2004, . Google Books.
 Hesiod, Theogony, in The Homeric Hymns and Homerica with an English Translation by Hugh G. Evelyn-White, Cambridge, Massachusetts, Harvard University Press; London, William Heinemann Ltd. 1914. Online version at the Perseus Digital Library.
 Homer, The Iliad with an English Translation by A.T. Murray, Ph.D. in two volumes. Cambridge, Massachusetts, Harvard University Press; London, William Heinemann, Ltd. 1924. Online version at the Perseus Digital Library.
 Homer, The Odyssey with an English Translation by A.T. Murray, PH.D. in two volumes. Cambridge, Massachusetts, Harvard University Press; London, William Heinemann, Ltd. 1919. Online version at the Perseus Digital Library.
 Homeric Hymn 2 to Demeter, in The Homeric Hymns and Homerica with an English Translation by Hugh G. Evelyn-White, Cambridge, Massachusetts, Harvard University Press; London, William Heinemann Ltd. 1914. Online version at the Perseus Digital Library.
 Homeric Hymn 3 to Apollo, in The Homeric Hymns and Homerica with an English Translation by Hugh G. Evelyn-White, Cambridge, Massachusetts, Harvard University Press; London, William Heinemann Ltd. 1914. Online version at the Perseus Digital Library.
 Homeric Hymn 4 to Hermes, in The Homeric Hymns and Homerica with an English Translation by Hugh G. Evelyn-White, Cambridge, Massachusetts, Harvard University Press; London, William Heinemann Ltd. 1914. Online version at the Perseus Digital Library.
 Homeric Hymn 28 to Athena, in The Homeric Hymns and Homerica with an English Translation by Hugh G. Evelyn-White, Cambridge, Massachusetts, Harvard University Press; London, William Heinemann Ltd. 1914. Online version at the Perseus Digital Library.
 Homeric Hymn 31 to Helios, in The Homeric Hymns and Homerica with an English Translation by Hugh G. Evelyn-White, Cambridge, Massachusetts, Harvard University Press; London, William Heinemann Ltd. 1914. Online version at the Perseus Digital Library.
 
 Mimnermus in Greek Elegiac Poetry: From the Seventh to the Fifth Centuries BC, edited and translated by Douglas E. Gerber, Loeb Classical Library No. 258, Cambridge, Massachusetts, Harvard University Press, 1999. . Online version at Harvard University Press.
 
 Nonnus, Dionysiaca; translated by Rouse, W H D, III Books XXXVI–XLVIII. Loeb Classical Library No. 346, Cambridge, Massachusetts, Harvard University Press; London, William Heinemann Ltd. 1940. Internet Archive.
 Pindar, Odes, Diane Arnson Svarlien. 1990. Online version at the Perseus Digital Library.
 Plato, Timaeus in Plato in Twelve Volumes, Vol. 9 translated by W.R.M. Lamb. Cambridge, Massachusetts, Harvard University Press; London, William Heinemann Ltd. 1925. Online version at the Perseus Digital Library.
 Smith, William, Dictionary of Greek and Roman Biography and Mythology, London (1873). Online version at the Perseus Digital Library.
 Sommerstein, Alan H., Aeschylus: Persians, Seven against Thebes, Suppliants, Prometheus Bound, edited and translated by Alan H. Sommerstein, Loeb Classical Library No. 145. Cambridge, Massachusetts, Harvard University Press, 2009. . Online version at Harvard University Press.
 Tripp, Edward, Crowell's Handbook of Classical Mythology, Thomas Y. Crowell Co; First edition (June 1970). .
 West, M. L. (1966), Hesiod: Theogony, Oxford University Press. .
 West, M. L. (2003a), Greek Epic Fragments: From the Seventh to the Fifth Centuries BC, edited and translated by Martin L. West, Loeb Classical Library No. 497, Cambridge, Massachusetts, Harvard University Press, 2003.  . Online version at Harvard University Press.
 West, M. L. (2003b), Homeric Hymns. Homeric Apocrypha. Lives of Homer, edited and translated by Martin L. West, Loeb Classical Library No. 496, Cambridge, Massachusetts, Harvard University Press, 2003.  . Online version at Harvard University Press.

External links 

 HYPERION from The Theoi Project
 HYPERION from greekmythology.com
 HYPERION from Mythopedia

Children of Gaia
Deities in the Iliad
Epithets of Helios
Greek gods
Helios in mythology
Light gods
Solar gods
Titans (mythology)
Metamorphoses characters